The German-Pennsylvanian Archive (Deutsch-Pennsylvanisches Archiv) is a collection of books, manuscripts, audio files, etc. about the Pennsylvania German language and culture. The archive is located in the Palatinate, Germany. It was founded in 1993 in Ludwigshafen am Rhein by Dr. Michael Werner, publisher of the Pennsylvania German newspaper Hiwwe wie Driwwe. It was moved to Ebertsheim in 1996 and to Ober-Olm in 2000. The archive is a member of the German-Pennsylvanian Association (Deutsch-Pennsylvanischer Arbeitskreis e.V.) in Germany. In 2017, the German-Pennsylvanian Archive was donated to the "Mennonite Research Center" (Mennonitische Forschungsstelle) at Weierhof, Palatinate (Germany). Actually, the archive consists of about 1,500 books and more than 16,000 texts of Pennsylvania German prose and poetry. Additionally, the archive holds a collection of about 800 Pennsylvania German groundhog lodge stories. At the new location, the collection will be available to the public.

References

External links
 Mennonitische Forschungsstelle
 Deutsch-Pennsylvanischer Arbeitskreis e. V.
 Hiwwe wie Driwwe - The Pennsylvania German Newspaper

Amish in Pennsylvania
Culture of Lancaster, Pennsylvania
European-American society
!
Mennonitism in Pennsylvania
Pennsylvania Dutch culture
German-American culture in Pennsylvania
German diaspora in North America
Pennsylvania Dutch language